Sciophilinae is a subfamily of fungus gnats (insects in the family Mycetophilidae). There are at least 40 genera and 340 described species in Sciophilinae.

Genera

 Acnemia
 Acomoptera
 Adicroneura
 Aglaomyia
 Allocotocera
 Anaclileia
 Aphrastomyia
 Apolephthisa
 Azana
 Baeopterogyna
 Boletina
 Cluzobra
 Coelophthinia
 Coelosia
 Docosia
 Drepanocerus
 Dziedzickia
 Ectrepesthoneura
 Eudicrana
 Garrettella
 Gnoriste
 Greenomyia
 Hadroneura
 Impleta
 Leia
 Leptomorphus
 Loicia
 Megalopelma
 Megophthalmidia
 Monoclona
 Mycoleia
 Mycomya
 Neoempheria
 Neuratelia
 Novakia
 Paratinia
 Phthinia
 Polylepta
 Rondaniella
 Saigusaia
 Sciophila
 Speolepta
 Stenophragma
 Synapha
 Syntemna
 Tetragoneura

References

Further reading

External links

 Diptera.info
 NCBI Taxonomy Browser, Sciophilinae

Mycetophilidae
Nematocera subfamilies